Kjell Olav Kran (born 10 August 1937) is a Norwegian business administrator and sports official. 

He was CEO of Sparebanken NOR from 1990 to 1999, and chairman of the board of Statoil from 1996 to 1999. He was president of the Norwegian Olympic Committee and Confederation of Sports from 1999 to 2004.

Sports career 
Kran was an active handball player in his younger days, playing in the Norwegian handball league and the Swiss league. As junior he also won National junior championships in tennis and was selected to the National youth bandy team.

References

1937 births
Living people
Sportspeople from Oslo
Norwegian bankers
Equinor people
Norwegian sports executives and administrators
Norwegian male handball players